Česukai is a village in Varėna district municipality, in Alytus County, southeastern Lithuania. According to the 2001 census, the village has a population of 5 people. The village is located 1 km south to Merkinė, between Nemunas and Merkys rivers, at Dzūkija National Park. Česukai is surrounded by a pine forest and it is only reachable by a forest road which branches from Vilnius-Hrodno highway.

Česukai is famous by its bioenergetic pyramid build by a local resident Povilas Žėkas. It is on the site of where he had a mystical experience as a child of seven on 20 August 1990. It attracts a broad range of people such as Laima Paksienė, wife of Rolandas Paksas, who goes there every two weeks sometimes with her whole family. She participated in a campaign to save the pyramid from demolition when this was proposed by Lithuanian officials. Many people visit this place believing that this pyramid has healing powers.

References

Villages in Alytus County
Varėna District Municipality